Peter and Catherine Reyer Farmhouse is a historic home located at Ephrata Township, Lancaster County, Pennsylvania. It was built in 1792, and is a two-story, four bay by two bay, limestone Germanic dwelling.  It was remodeled about 1875, into a Pennsylvania style farmhouse.

It was listed on the National Register of Historic Places in 1996.

References

Houses on the National Register of Historic Places in Pennsylvania
Houses completed in 1792
Houses in Lancaster County, Pennsylvania
National Register of Historic Places in Lancaster County, Pennsylvania